Roger Richard Shoals (born December 13, 1938) is a former American football player who played offensive tackle at the University of Maryland, followed by nine seasons in the National Football League (NFL).

After retiring from the NFL, Shoals went to work for Gould Paper Corporation where he became vice president of sales.  He is currently 1/3 owner of a Cadillac-Buick-GMC dealership in Fleetwood, Pennsylvania known as Kutztown Auto Company.

1938 births
Living people
American football offensive linemen
Cleveland Browns players
Detroit Lions players
Denver Broncos players
Maryland Terrapins football players
American automobile salespeople